WBBL was a radio station in Richmond, Virginia, United States, which broadcast from 1924 until 1989. It was Richmond's first radio station, owned for its entire existence by the Grace Covenant Presbyterian Church. The station was on the air as a part-time operation throughout its entire existence, broadcasting Grace Covenant's Sunday church services as well as other programming on Sunday night. From 1945 to 1989, it broadcast for a total of two hours and 15 minutes a week.

Beginning in 1945, WBBL shared time with WLEE, which began operating on 1450 kHz that year and moved to 1480 kHz in 1950. WBBL's programming was broadcast over WLEE's transmitter. WLEE was shut down for economic reasons at the end of 1988, taking WBBL off the air with it after two more church service broadcasts in January 1989. It was the oldest station in Richmond and the second-oldest in Virginia at the time of its closing. Grace Covenant has continued to broadcast church services over other stations.

Foundation
On January 27 or 30, 1924, the Rev. R. A. Torrey was slated to speak at Grace Covenant. The church understood that the demand for his sermon would surpass the 600-seat capacity of its sanctuary on Richmond's Monument Avenue and so conceived of the idea of using the new method of radio to expand the congregation. A member of the church drove from Richmond to the Department of Commerce in Washington, D.C., to secure a radio license. The station went on the air with Torrey's speech. The February Radio Service Bulletin listed WBBL for the first time as a 10-watt operation broadcasting at 1060 kHz; the call sign assignment was sequential, falling after WBBK in Pittsburgh and before WBBM in Lincoln, Illinois. It was rebuilt as a 100-watt station that September.

In its early months, when it was still Richmond's only radio station, WBBL also broadcast several non-church programs as well as a weekly Tuesday night program. On multiple occasions, it broadcast election returns in partnership with the Richmond Times-Dispatch. It partnered with Richmond's other major newspaper, the News Leader, to air college football and other sports events. These broadcasts were slowly curtailed after 1925, when WRVA began broadcasting; WBBL sometimes did not broadcast to allow more exposure for WRVA's output. What had once been makeshift studios on the third floor were reconditioned in early 1927.

A series of national radio dial reorganizations undertaken by the Federal Radio Commission (FRC) resulted in three frequency changes in two years. WBBL was moved from 1310 kHz to 1210 kHz on June 1, then to 1280 kHz in November 1927. However, as part of its plan to reduce the number of stations and secure the future of viable radio services, the FRC put WBBL and another Richmond station, WMBG, on the chopping block among 163 nationwide. It ordered these stations to plead their case as to why they should be renewed, stating that "the commission, after an examination of the applications for renewal of the licenses of these stations, has not been satisfied that the public interest, convenience or necessity will be served by granting these applications". Hearings were held in mid-July on the two Richmond outlets affected, but it was evident at hearing that WBBL would survive, with chairman Ira E. Robinson stating he was satisfied. After being renewed, WBBL was moved again, this time to 1370 kHz, as part of General Order 40 on November 11, 1928.

On June 6, 1930, the FRC granted a petition for WMBG to go to unlimited time six days a week by sharing 1210 kHz with WBBL on Sundays. WBBL was given the hours of 10:30 a.m. to 1:30 p.m., 5:30 to 7 p.m., and 7:30 to 9:30 p.m. The time-sharing agreement with WMBG continued until that station was approved to move to 1350 kHz in January 1937. WBBL continued to broadcast on Sundays at 1210, moving to 1240 kHz with NARBA in March 1941.

Sharing time with WLEE

In June 1944, two complementary applications were filed at the Federal Communications Commission (FCC), which had replaced the FRC a decade earlier. One was by Thomas Garland Tinsley, Jr., seeking to build a new radio station at 1240 kHz. The other was by Grace Covenant, which sought to reduce its allotted hours to 11 a.m. to 12:15 p.m. and 8 to 9 p.m. on Sundays if the new station license were awarded. Tinsley had arranged a 10-year lease for WBBL's equipment. The applications were granted by the FCC on December 19, 1944, but for 1450 kHz with 250 watts. WLEE began broadcasting on October 1, 1945, and after more than 20 years, transmission of WBBL shifted from the church on Monument Avenue to the commercial outlet's site on Colorado Avenue.

In 1949, WLEE was approved to change frequencies to 1480 kHz and upgrade to 5,000 watts from a new transmitter site on Broad Street, and the FCC also permitted WBBL to make the change alongside it in August 1950, when both stations made their last move on the dial.

With just two hours and 15 minutes of allotted airtime a week, WBBL's output consisted of the Sunday 11 a.m. church service and the Presbyterian Radio Hour, produced at one time by longtime Richmond radio man Alden Aaroe. As WLEE became Richmond's number-one Top 40 station, the church opted to focus its night hour on outreach to WLEE's younger audience. The result was a program called Showcase and later Celebration Rock, hosted by Jeff Kellam and spotlighting Christian rock music. This program ultimately became nationally syndicated. As music audiences shifted to FM and WLEE retargeted at older listeners, and because Celebration Rock already had an FM station, it was replaced with an offering known as Flight 1480 and then Alternatives, a magazine program with a call-in format.

End of operations

On December 29, 1988, Gilcom Corporation of Virginia, which had owned WLEE since October 1984, announced it would shut the station down on December 31 of that year and surrender the license to the Federal Communications Commission (FCC). While the station had not made money for a decade, the proximate cause was the failure of a plan to improve WLEE's nighttime broadcast facility. In 1984, Gilcom sold part of the transmitter site property to be developed into a new Courtyard by Marriott hotel. The hotel property occupied land on which two of the four towers in the array sat. In late 1985, Gilcom had filed to build two new towers at 6200 West Broad Street, but it was forced to redo the plan for a three-tower array. The three-tower radiation pattern only covered 70 percent of the area, prompting the commission to withhold approval. The delay in obtaining FCC approval for a construction permit caused a potential buyer to walk away from the station, and even though the permit came in November 1988, it was too late to save the station.

Because WBBL was dependent on WLEE's facilities to broadcast, the church found itself in the position of holding a license without a transmission facility. For the first two Sundays of 1989, WBBL turned on WLEE's transmitter two more times to air services; it then began to rent time from WTVR (1380 AM). When a "new" WLEE at 1320 kHz briefly broadcast from February to the start of May, Grace moved there, but the venture was saddled by financial difficulties and forced off the air. WLEE was sold and returned to the air later in the year; however, Grace Covenant was not part of the new station, and services moved to WTVR-FM 98.1. Though plans were investigated to move WBBL to another frequency or even go full-time on 1480, no such arrangement ever became reality. The FCC marked WBBL's license as deleted in its system on March 14, 1994, marking the definitive end of the oldest station in Richmond and the second-oldest in Virginia.

Since the closure of WBBL, the church has continued to produce its services for air on other stations. In 2000, Grace Covenant broadcast its 4,000th service. By 2020, services were airing on Christian station WLES (590 AM).

Notes

References

1924 establishments in Virginia
1989 disestablishments in Virginia
Radio stations established in 1924
Radio stations disestablished in 1989
Defunct radio stations in the United States
Defunct mass media in Virginia
Radio stations in Richmond, Virginia